Peniki is a rural locality (a village) in Lomonosovsky District of Leningrad Oblast, Russia. Municipally, it is a part and the administrative center of Penikovskoye Rural Settlement.

Name of the village 
The village is known since the 19th century. During the Emancipation Reform of 1861 in the Russian Empire, the local Orthodox priest Vasily wrote a description of the poverty and profiteering of the country's folks, which has been preserved. The priest often report about the peasants, so the landlords knew all about their faults.

At this time, a manor was built here, at which the owner bred hounds and sold puppies. It is from this enterprise that the town's name derives - Peniki (Penniki, Penikkala), which is from the Finnish word penikka, which means "a puppy."

Climate 
The climate in the village of Peniki is close to a cool temperate climate with moderately warm summers and moderately cold winters. Under the Köppen climate classification, Peniki is classified as Dfb, a humid continental climate. The winters are warmer here than in Moscow due to its closeness to the Gulf of Finland. The Gulf of Finland is located just 1 km from the center of the village. The average maximum temperature in July is 22 °C (71.6 °F), and the average minimum temperature in February is −10.5 °C (13.1 °F). Average annual precipitation is 669 millimeters (26.338 in) per year.

History 

Thus, the territory of the Lomonosov district of the Leningrad region (including the territory of the modern Peniki) was the property of Sweden. It was the historical region of Ingria in the period of 1617–1721. Then the territory was returned to Russian Empire.

The village of Peniki is marked on the Semi-topographical map of 1810.

On the "Topographic Map of the Neighborhoods of Saint Petersburg" of the Military Topographic Depot of the General Staff of 1817, the village of Peniki is mentioned. It further provides that in Peniki were 16 households.

The village of Peniki with 16 households is also mentioned on the "Topographical map of the environs of St. Petersburg" by Friedrich von Schubert in 1831:
Peniki is a village which belongs to the Grand Duke Mikhail Pavlovich, the number of inhabitants by the revision: 44 males, 48 females (1838 year).

As indicated in the explanatory text to the ethnographic map of Saint Petersburg Governorate by P. I. Köppen of 1849, it is recorded as the village of Penikkala (Penniki, Peniki) and indicates the number of its inhabitants for 1848: Ingrians-Äyrämöisets – 11 m., 15 f., Ingrians-Savonians – 16 m., 17 f., Izhorians – 32 m., 33 f., total population is 124 people.

In 1860, the village of Peniki had 25 households.

On the map of 1863 the village is marked as Penniki, but on the map drawn in 1925, the name Peniki started being used.

By 1913 the number of households increased to 35.

According to the topographic map of 1939, the village had 70 households.

By ethnic nationality, the overwhelming majority of the village population after the year 1942, were Russians. The indigenous population – Izhorians and Ingrians - were deported and repressed by Stalin. Presently, however, they are fully assimilated in Russian society.

Geography 
The village is located in the northern part of the area near the southern shore of the Gulf of Finland, to the west of the city Lomonosov. and to the east of the village Bolshaya Izhora. The distance to the raion center is 9 km. It is also 2 kilometers away from the nearest railway station in Bronka.

Demography

Communications infrastructure 
The Peniki village has two Internet service providers (ISP) providing high-speed Internet. These are Viartcom and Freedom House. Telecommunication is also available and the telephone dialing code of the village is +7 813-7654 (+7 – Russian country calling code, 813 – Leningrad Oblast code).

Transportation 
There is a bus transportation available (buses No. 691 and No. 691A). In addition to bus transportation, there is a fixed-route taxi K-502  (Lomonosov→Malaya Izhora→Peniki→Dubki→Bolshaya Izhora and Bolshaya Izhora→Dubki→Peniki→Malaya Izhora→Lomonosov). A part of the Saint Petersburg Ring Road (the western half-ring) also passes through the territory of the Penikovskoye Rural Settlement.

References

External links 
 
 Official site of the Peniki Rural Settlement 

Rural localities in Leningrad Oblast
Petergofsky Uyezd
Lomonosovsky District, Leningrad Oblast